Anne Low (b. 1981) is a multi-disciplinary artist based in Montreal, Canada. She uses sculpture, installation, textiles and printmaking to explore the relationship of historical contexts of contemporary functional objects and themes that occur, such as the domestic and the decorative. Her works highly focus on the physicality of an object and utilize her historic knowledge of weaving and various methodologies.

Biography 
Low was born in the rural town of Stratford, Ontario and is the granddaughter of dairy farmers and sleigh builders. 

Although she grew up far from flourishing art scenes that could be found throughout big cities, she decided to pursue an artistic career and achieved an education both within and outside of Canada.

Education 
Low trained at the Emily Carr Institute of Art & Design (formerly the Emily Carr Institute of Art and Design) and completed a Bachelor of Fine Arts (BFA) Integrated Media in 2003. She continued her education in the arts at the Royal College of Art in London, United Kingdom, and received a Master of Arts (MA) in Curating Contemporary Art, with emphasis on exhibition practice, in 2006.  

After taking a long hiatus from her artistic career, she found her way back through self-taught weaving and attended the Marshfield School of Weaving in Marshfield, Vermont from 2013-2014 to further sharpen her skills.

Selected solo exhibitions 

2019: Anne Low: Chair for a woman, Contemporary Art Gallery (CAG), Vancouver, British Columbia
2017: Anne Low: Witch With Comb, Artspeak, Vancouver, British Columbia

Selected group exhibitions 

 2019: Sites of the Future, Tensta Konsthall, Stockholm, Sweden
 2019: Sobey Art Award, Art Gallery of Alberta, Edmonton, Alberta 
 2019: Berlinale: 14th Forum Expanded New Spaces – More Time, Ebensperger Rhomberg, Berlin, Germany
 2018: Anne Low & Evan Calder Williams: The Fine Thread of Deviation, Mercer Union, Toronto, Ontario
 2018: Snart nog: Konst och handling, Tensta Konsthall, Stockholm, Sweden
 2017: Separation Penetrates, Mercer Union, Toronto, Ontario
 2016: Vancouver Special: Ambivalent Pleasures, Vancouver Art Gallery, Vancouver, British Columbia
 2015: Reading the Line, Western Front, Vancouver, British Columbia

Awards 

 2019: nominated for the Sobey Art Award, Canada's largest award for young Canadian artists.

References

External links 

 Anne Low official website

1981 births
Living people